Gilberto Trindade de Souza Neto (born 26 June 1993), known as Gilberto Neto or simply Gilberto, is a Brazilian footballer who plays as a forward for Patrocinense on loan from Marcílio Dias.

Career statistics

References

External links
 
 Gilberto at ZeroZero

1993 births
Living people
Brazilian footballers
Brazilian expatriate footballers
Association football forwards
Campeonato Brasileiro Série D players
Ykkönen players
Marília Atlético Clube players
Ituano FC players
AC Oulu players
Guarani de Palhoça players
Maringá Futebol Clube players
Clube Náutico Marcílio Dias players
Joinville Esporte Clube players
Camboriú Futebol Clube players
Clube Atlético Patrocinense players
Brazilian expatriate sportspeople in Finland
Expatriate footballers in Finland